Saint-Grégoire is a community of the city of Bécancour, Quebec, Canada.  It is one of the major population centres within the city.  Autoroute 55 intersects Autoroute 30 and Route 132 at Saint-Grégoire.

References

Neighbourhoods in Bécancour